Anarsia lechriosema is a moth in the family Gelechiidae. It was described by John David Bradley in 1982. It is found on Norfolk Island.

References

lechriosema
Moths described in 1982
Moths of Australia